Yevhen Yevseyev (born 9 May 1987) is a Ukrainian footballer who is a football functionary for Ukrainian Premier League club FC Kolos Kovalivka.
.

External links 

1987 births
Living people
Ukrainian footballers
FC Yednist Plysky players
FC CSKA Kyiv players
NK Veres Rivne players
FC Naftovyk-Ukrnafta Okhtyrka players
FC Kolos Kovalivka players
FC Dinaz Vyshhorod players
FC Putrivka players
FC Lyubomyr Stavyshche players
Association football midfielders